John Bainbridge Copnall (1928–2007) was an English artist best known for his abstract expressionist painting of richly coloured stylised realism, often on a grand scale. He was also a teacher of painting for twenty years at the Central School of Art and Design in London.

Early life 
John Copnall was born in Slinfold, a village near Horsham in West Sussex. His father was the eminent sculptor Edward Bainbridge Copnall (1903–1970) whilst his mother Muriel was an enthusiastic amateur artist. His uncle and aunt, Frank and Teresa Copnall, who were both professional artists of some standing. Another uncle, Hubert Picton Copnall (1918–1997), was also an artist and sculptor, although he spent over thirty years as a farmer. His paternal grandfather, Edward White Copnall,  was an early photographer and artist.

Copnall showed early promise in drawing and at the age of eighteen he began studying at the Architectural Association in London. This proved a poor choice of a career as Copnall lacked the required mathematical ability and used the excuse of his National Service to leave architecture permanently in order to become a professional artist.

Career in Spain 
Initially Copnall started his painting studies under the tutelage of his father at the Sir John Cass School of Art in the City of London and from June 1950 to June 1955 under the artist Sir Henry Rushbury at the Royal Academy School. His early work was largely figurative and he won Turner Gold Medal for Landscape Painting in his penultimate year in 1954.

In 1954 Copnall and his artist friend Bert Flugelmanvisited Spain for what was intended to be a short visit but he fell in love with the Iberian landscape and stayed for fourteen years. Whilst on Ibiza he married his first wife Madeleine Chardon with whom he had a daughter and when the marriage ended he moved to the mainland to live in a hacienda in the mountains above Malaga where he earned a living as a painter sometimes using the name of Juan de Retamá. The intense light of Spain and the visceral nature of its people changed his art fundamentally as he experimented with intense earthy colours whilst increasingly moving towards abstraction. Throughout his career Copnall was interested in using intense colour and the Spanish light undoubtedly enhanced his artistic senses.

As the 1960's progressed Copnall became fashionable and he began to sell his paintings to private collectors, including actor Melvyn Douglas. He had several solo exhibitions in Spain and Catalonia as well as shows in Germany where he was also popular and a lesser one in England in Newcastle. He said of his life in the 1960s: "No Beatles, but plenty of bullfighting, flamenco and Rioja!"

Return to England 
In 1968 Copnall returned to England and the following year held a solo exhibition at the Bear Lane Gallery in Oxford. His work of this period displayed the influence of American abstract  expressionists such as Barnett Newman, Morris Louis and Mark Rothko with Copnall using acrylic paint on cotton duck on increasingly larger canvasses. His use of colour was exuberant. Copnall stated that 'Painting is colour and colour is painting." In 1970 he won the E. A. Abbey Scholarship  and further recognition followed with Arts Council awards in 1973 and a British Council Award in 1979. As the 60s progressed abstract art began to lose influence as new 'pop' style were in vogue and to some extent Copnall found himself less fashionable during the late 1970s and 1980s.

A series of solo exhibitions were held throughout the 1970s but Copnall was becoming a peripheral figure in the context of mainstream English art.Nevertheless, his influence on the next generation of British artists is evident following a twenty-year period from 1973 to 1993 when Copnall worked as a teacher at the Canterbury School of Art and the Central School of Art and Design. He had married for the second time in 1976 to Caroline Brown with whom he had a son and a daughter and he required the financial stability that teaching provided. The marriage was dissolved in 1997.

Later years in London
By 1982, Copnall was working in an artists' colony in the East End of London having been part of a group which bought the defunct Spratt's dog biscuit warehouse in Bow whilst he continued his teaching role. In 1996 his solo show Reflections, Orbits and Radiances in the De La Warr Pavilion in Bexhill-on-Sea, Sussex drew mainly on work done in the period 1992-96. In the catalogue, Christopher Lloyd, Surveyor of the Queen's Pictures, considered that it was "difficult to think of a more appropriate setting for John Copnall's paintings" than this light-filled example of pioneering mid-1930s architecture.

Copnall was elected to the London Group in 1988. During the final years of his life, Copnall painted infrequently and ceased all together following a stroke. He died on 9 June 2007 following a short illness.

References

External links

http://www.modernbritishartists.co.uk
http://www.artnet.com/artists/john-copnall/
http://www.britishartists.co.uk/john_copnall/index.htm

1928 births
2007 deaths
20th-century English painters
21st-century English painters
Abstract expressionist artists
Academics of the Central School of Art and Design
Alumni of the Royal Academy Schools
British landscape painters
English male painters
People from Slinfold
20th-century English male artists
21st-century English male artists